Paleta may refer to:
 Paleta (dessert), a Mexican ice pop
 Paleta (surname)
 Paleta Frontón, a Peruvian sport
 "Paleta" (song), by Ha*Ash
Paleta is the term in Spanish for pork and lamb front leg cut, known as shoulder arm in some markets. Paleta de cerdo or Paletilla is the front leg equivalent of Jamón.

See also
Paletta, a surname
Palette (disambiguation)
Pelota, the name of several Spanish ball games
Paleta, Spanish word